Chloe So (born 6 April 1994) is a Hong Kong actress, singer and model. She is an artist under the brand Sun Entertainment.

Biography 

Chloe So grew up in Tai Kok Tsui, an older neighbourhood in Hong Kong, she had an average relation with her family. She studied in Lung Kong World Federation School Limited Lau Wong Fat Secondary School. In 2008, she participated the 12th Yes! Student Model Election, and entered the final round-of-20s. The reason of her participation in that Election is that being a model is her dream job and she hopes that she can be on photos that will be published on magazines. While she was still studying, she also became a part-time model on Magazines with her friend, Z. Koo.

In 2011, she signed a model contract with Sun Entertainment. In 2015 she signed a singer contract with Sun Entertainment, she was chosen in the talent show held in Commercial Radio Program Tricky to become a member of girl group As One along with three other members, Kayan Chan (Kayan), Yuen Ching Chan (Tania) and Ng Shi Kai (Shin) to go to Korea to get training and officially start the musical career，becoming the second vocal.

When the girl group disbanded in December 2017, she continued her work as a model while starting to become an actor. Her first work is a ViuTV drama, Margaret and David series: Ex while learning how to improve her acting with Sammy Lam, Yau Chung Wai and Kearen Pang. In Spring 2018, she was chosen in the vintage ad of a lemon tea brand, she was noticed by netizens because she look like Vivian Chow, the actor in the original ad. In 2020, she played as the protagonist's daughter, Keung Tsz Yau in TVB drama, Life After Death.  Her look stands out and people noticed her. She joined Shaw Brothers that year until July 2022.

Discography
 2018: "精靈寶可夢點點名" (Pokemon HK Cartoon Theme Song)

Filmography

Drama

Films

Music videos

Other 
 2018: Arm Channel TV "The crush in My Dream" - Emilia

References

External links 
 
 
 
 

1994 births
Living people
Hong Kong people
Hong Kong film actresses
Hong Kong television actresses
Hong Kong female models